George Edward Price (1842–1926) was a Royal Navy officer and a Conservative politician who represented Devonport .

Price was the son of George Price and Hon Emily Valentine Plunkett daughter of Edward Plunkett, 14th Baron Dunsany. He joined the Royal Navy and attained the rank of captain. In 1874 Price was elected MP for Plymouth Devonport and held the seat until 1892.

Price married Gertrude Laurence on 6 February 1873 and had several children. His residence was Carlton Hall at Carlton, Suffolk

References

External links 
 

1842 births
1926 deaths
Royal Navy officers
Conservative Party (UK) MPs for English constituencies
UK MPs 1874–1880
UK MPs 1880–1885
UK MPs 1885–1886
UK MPs 1886–1892